Ognyan Velikov Nikolov (born 13 June 1949) is a retired Bulgarian freestyle wrestler. He won a silver medal at the 1972 Olympics and a bronze at the 1971 World Championships. At the European championships, he won a gold, a silver and a bronze medal in 1969–1974, placing fourth-fifth in 1975–76.

References

External links
 

1949 births
Living people
Sportspeople from Sofia
Olympic wrestlers of Bulgaria
Wrestlers at the 1972 Summer Olympics
Bulgarian male sport wrestlers
Olympic silver medalists for Bulgaria
Olympic medalists in wrestling
Medalists at the 1972 Summer Olympics
European Wrestling Championships medalists
World Wrestling Championships medalists
20th-century Bulgarian people
21st-century Bulgarian people